The Poplar River is a  tributary of the Lost River of western Minnesota in the United States.  Via the Lost River, the Clearwater River, the Red Lake River, the Red River of the North, Lake Winnipeg, and the Nelson River, it is part of the Hudson Bay watershed.

The river's name comes from the Ojibwe Indians of the area, on account of the poplar trees near the river.

See also
List of rivers of Minnesota

References

Minnesota Watersheds
USGS Hydrologic Unit Map - State of Minnesota (1974)

Rivers of Polk County, Minnesota
Rivers of Mahnomen County, Minnesota
Rivers of Red Lake County, Minnesota
Rivers of Minnesota
Tributaries of Hudson Bay